Oreste Bonomi (Milan, 15 July 1902 – Rome, 26 April 1983) was an Italian Fascist politician, who served as the last Minister for Exchanges and Currencies of the Mussolini Cabinet from February to July 1943.

Biography

The son of Giovanni Bonomi and Angela Penagini, he worked as a merchant and accountant, and was President of the national federation of traders. In the early 1920s he was a squadrista in Milan and participated in the march on Rome. In 1934 he was elected to the Italian Chamber of Deputies with the National Fascist Party and in 1939 he became a member of the Chamber of Fasces and Corporations. Among his offices were that of Director General of Tourism and Deputy Commissioner for the 1942 World Exhibition in Rome. During the Second Italo-Ethiopian War he flew as a bomber pilot for the Regia Aeronautica, participating in the battles of Shire, Tembien and Amba Aradam, as well as in a demonstrative flight over Addis Ababa, and being awarded a Silver Medal of Military Valor. After the outbreak of the Second World War, he again participated in bombing missions in North Africa and the Mediterranean, earning a Bronze Medal of Military Valor. From 6 February to 25 July 1943 he was Minister of Exchanges and Currencies during the last phase of the Mussolini Cabinet. After the fall of the Fascist regime and the German occupation of Italy he fled to Switzerland.

References

External links

1902 births
1983 deaths
Finance ministers of Italy
Mussolini Cabinet
Italian military personnel of World War II
Italian military personnel of the Second Italo-Ethiopian War
Members of the Chamber of Deputies (Kingdom of Italy)
Members of the Chamber of Fasces and Corporations
National Fascist Party politicians
Deputies of Legislature XXIX of the Kingdom of Italy
Recipients of the Silver Medal of Military Valor
Recipients of the Bronze Medal of Military Valor

it:Oreste Bonomi
fr:Oreste Bonomi